A chief information officer in higher education is the senior executive who is responsible for information and communications technology in the university, college or other higher education institution. The position may not necessarily be called a CIO in some institutions. The CIO title is often coupled with Vice President/Vice Chancellor of information technology, is primarily used at doctoral/research institutions, while the titles of Director or Dean are more common at the other five types of Carnegie Classification of Institutions of Higher Education; MA I, MA II, BA Liberal Arts, BA General, and AA. In addition, the CIO title used at different institutions may represent unique positions with differing roles and responsibilities. Ultimately, there is no one definition for a CIO; it has a variety of meanings, functions, areas of purview, reporting structures, and required qualifications.
Some traditional executive and administrative positions in higher education, such as a chief financial officer position or chief academic officer/provost have been in existence for a long time and typically have a definite career path. In contrast, the position of CIO in higher education, which has only been around for about 35 years, has no single career path nor single model to explain what can be expected of CIOs in higher education, which makes it a challenge and an opportunity for those interested in preparing for such a role (Brown, 2009; Cash & Pearlson, 2004; Nelson, 2003). Brian L. Hawkins (2004), former president of Educause concluded:
There is no defined career path for CIOs, nor is there any certification, degree, or even a common body of knowledge that such a ::person should have mastered in order to fulfill this kind of position effectively…finding the right CIO is more about aligning ::personal traits, skills, professional orientation, proven success, and vision with a given campus culture and climate. (p. 100)

That being said, research in this field including recent surveys of technology leaders, CIOs and academic leaders in higher education institutions provides data on the current and expected levels of academic degrees of CIOs and their perceived required skill set. This, in turn, may mean that prospective CIOs who prepare in a manner to meet these perceived expectations in terms of academic degrees and skills may be more likely to be successful in being hired into the position of CIO and succeeding at it. The next two sections explore these two areas, that is, the academic degree preparation and skill set needed for CIOs in higher education.

Qualifications

A review of CIO vacancy positions and requirements between April 2009 and May 2010 from the Chronicle of Higher Education, Educause and HigherEdJobs.com found that only 44.30% of the positions required a graduate degree as a requirement (Brown, 2010a). Brown speculates that position postings that do state a graduate degree requirement are simply attempting to create a larger pool of candidates. Brown (2010b)  reported that 79% of CIOs (who responded to his survey) have graduate degrees, and this percentage has been steadily increasing since 2007. According to Brown’s 2010 survey, 58% of CIOs have master's degrees while 21% have a doctorate.  Of those possessing a doctorate, these CIOs were working in all types of institutions ranging from doctoral-granting institutions to those with a special focus. About one third of these CIOs were working at a Master’s institutions while another third were working at a doctoral-granting institution. In contrast, his survey showed that the majority of CIOs with a master's degree as their highest level of academic preparation were working at institutions granting only associate degrees.

In terms of degree majors for CIO positions, Brown  found that 40% of the job postings did not identify the major preferred and another 44% requested a computer related major, or in IT or business. 46% of CIOs and 48% of members of the institution management team believed that the degree major was not important (Brown, 2010a). On a related note, the top four degree majors for technology leaders which comprised 70% of the responses were technology, business, education and administration (Brown, 2010a).

Skill-sets

What skill set is needed to successfully serve in the role of Chief Information Officer in higher education? A review of the literature provides some useful perspectives. Linda Fleit (1999), the former president and founder of the IT Consulting Firm Edutech International from 1985 to 2008 and through this experience, well acquainted with the role CIOs in higher education institutions, indicated seven areas which she felt were requirements for CIOs. These included (as cited in Hawkins, 2004): 1) a clear vision about the role on information technology in higher education; 2) excellent oral and written communication and listening skills; 3) ability to form alliances and relationships with key campus constituents; 4) the ability to work collaboratively and effectively; 5) the ability to make and back hard decisions; 6) the ability to manage resources judiciously, and 7) deep expertise and knowledge in at least one aspect of technology. Cash and Pearlson (2004), representing the Harvard Graduate School of Business Administration and the Concours Group, respectively, identify leadership, business and technical competencies as essential for CIOs in higher education. Carol A. Cartwright (2002), who served as president of Kent State University from 1991 to 2006 and who is currently serving as president of Bowling Green State University, sought several essential qualifications in a CIO who would be expected to serve as a full-fledged member of her “executive orchestra”: proven leadership skills, strong management skills, and an understanding of the difference between these two. Wayne Brown (2010b), the CIO at Excelsior College who has conducted annual surveys with CIOs and executive management on the role and effectiveness of CIOs since 2003, surveyed 440 CIOs in higher education in 2010 to determine what they considered the top skills needed to be effective in their positions. Brown (2010b) reported that a CIOs’ top five skills in order were: communication skills, leadership, technical knowledge, interpersonal skills and higher education knowledge. The same question posed to members of the management team at higher education institutions revealed that they ranked the same top five skills as important but in a different order: technical knowledge, communication skills, leadership, higher education knowledge, and interpersonal skills. Lastly, Hawkins (2004) identified five skills that he believed were critical to success as a CIO in higher education: strong communication skills, boundary-spanning ability (i.e. the ability to work across the silos that often exist at institutions), leadership ability, management experience, and a strong understanding of the academic environment.

Although there is some variance in the literature as to the best skills and competencies to possess to succeed as a CIO in higher education, the common elements across most of these appear to include leadership skills, management skills, communication skills, business knowledge, higher education experience/knowledge, interpersonal skills, and technical skills/deep knowledge in one aspect of technology. What is unclear in the literature is the quantity and quality of these skills, but most likely these will vary depending on the individual institutional context.

Career prospects
According to Brown (2010b), in 2010 59% of CIOs responding to his survey were over 51 years of age compared to 55% in this age bracket in 2009. In addition, he reported that 47% of CIOs in 2010 planned to retire within the next 10 years. Furthermore, his report showed that the average CIO tenure in higher education in 2010 was an average of 6 years, 8 months, which is a drop from 2007 where the average tenure was 7 years, 5 months. The combination of these factors---the aging CIO, retirement plans, the faster change-over in CIO positions—presents a promising picture of job prospects for those seeking CIO positions in higher education in coming years.

See also 
 Fractional CIO
 Chief information officer
 Chief technology officer
 IT governance
 IT strategy

References

Sources 

 
Information systems
Management occupations
University governance